François Joseph Marie Antoine Blanchy, best known as François Blanchy (12 December 1886 – 2 October 1960) was a tennis player competing for France. He competed at the 1912 Summer Olympics and the 1920 Summer Olympics.

Career
Runner-up to Maurice Germot in the singles final of the Amateur French Championships in 1910, Blanchy eventually won the title in 1923 over eight-time champion Max Decugis. He also won the doubles title at the tournament in 1923, partnering Jean Samazeuilh. Blanchy later became a sports official, directing the Villa Primrose (Bordeaux tennis club), and the French Tennis Federation.

References

External links
 
 
 
 

1886 births
1960 deaths
French Championships (tennis) champions
French male tennis players
Tennis players from Bordeaux
Olympic tennis players of France
Tennis players at the 1912 Summer Olympics
Tennis players at the 1920 Summer Olympics